Chapra Assembly constituency is an assembly constituency in Nadia district in the Indian state of West Bengal.

Overview
As per orders of the Delimitation Commission, No. 82 Chapra Assembly constituency is composed of the following: Chapra community development block.

Chapra Assembly constituency is part of No. 12 Krishnanagar (Lok Sabha constituency).

Members of Legislative Assembly

Election results

2021

.# Jeber Sekh, contesting as an Independent candidate, was a rebel Trinamool Congress member.

2016

2011
In the 2011 election, Rukbanur Rahaman of Trinamool Congress defeated his nearest rival Shamsul Islam Mollah of CPI(M).

 

.# Swing calculated on Congress+Trinamool Congress vote percentages taken together in 2006.

1977-2006
In 2006 and 2001 state assembly elections, Shamsul Islam Mollah of CPI(M) won the Chapra assembly seat defeating his nearest rivals, Abdur Rashid Mollick of Congress in 2006 and Julfikar Khan of Trinamool Congress in 2001. Contests in most years were multi cornered but only winners and runners are being mentioned. Mir Quasem Mondal of CPI(M)  defeated Julfikar Khan representing Congress in 1996, and  Arun Kumar Ghosh of Congress in 1991. Mir Qusem of CPI(M) defeated Dilip Dutta of Congress in 1987. Sahabauddin Mondal of CPI(M) defeated Arun Biswas, Independent, in 1982 and Kazi Safluddin of Janata Party in 1977.

1962–1972
Ghiasuddin Ahmad of Congress won in 1972. Sahabuddin Mondal of CPI(M) won in 1971. Salil Behari Hundle of Bangla Congress won in 1969. J.Mojumdar of Bangla Congress won in 1967. Mohananda Haldar of Sanjukta Biplabi Parishad won in 1962, The Chapra constituency did not exist prior to that.

References

Assembly constituencies of West Bengal
Politics of Nadia district